Wang Libin (born March 21, 1963) is a former male Chinese basketball player and an active basketball coach. He was born in Shaanxi Province, People's Republic of China.

Wang started his playing career at the age of 14 and was one of the most talented front court players in Asia.  6'8", Wang was not only a powerful inside player with solid footwork and impressive mobility but also a stable long range shooter.  Some dubbed him as "Asia's number one centre" during his prime in the 1980s.  As a member of the China men's national basketball team he competed at the 1984 Los Angeles Olympic Games and was the flag bearer of the Chinese Olympic Team at the opening ceremony.  Due to power struggles within China's basketball authorities, however, he was banned from playing for the national team at the age of 25—shortly after he competed at the 1988 Summer Olympics.

After this forced "retirement", Wang accepted the invitation by a semi-professional club, Isuzu Motors Lynx,  based in Yokohama, Japan to play there.  In 1993, he moved to play for the Tera Electronics club in Taiwan and retired there after a decade-long "post-retirement" career as overseas professional player.  Owning a restaurant named after his triple-double ("大三元") record in Taipei, Wang later served in ESPN Star Sports as a basketball analyst/commentator in Mandarin Chinese.  He also participated in the training of the Chinese Taipei men's national basketball team.

In 2004, Wang returned to his hometown, Xi'an, to coach the Shaanxi Kylins, a professional team in the Chinese Basketball Association (CBA).  After two unsuccessful seasons coaching in the CBA, Wang resigned as the Kylins head coach and accepted another commission to coach the Northwestern Polytechnical University varsity team.

References

 sports-reference

1963 births
Living people
Akita Isuzu/Isuzu Motors Lynx/Giga Cats players
Basketball players at the 1984 Summer Olympics
Basketball players at the 1988 Summer Olympics
Basketball players from Shaanxi
Chinese men's basketball players
1982 FIBA World Championship players
Olympic basketball players of China
Sportspeople from Xi'an
Asian Games medalists in basketball
Basketball players at the 1982 Asian Games
Basketball players at the 1986 Asian Games
Centers (basketball)
Asian Games gold medalists for South Korea
Asian Games silver medalists for South Korea
Chinese expatriate basketball people in Japan
Medalists at the 1982 Asian Games
Medalists at the 1986 Asian Games
Chinese expatriate basketball people in Taiwan
Chinese Taipei men's national basketball team coaches
Mars basketball players
BCC Mars players
Chinese Basketball Alliance players